The Manny V. Pangilinan Cup, also known as the MVP Cup, is an international basketball tournament in the Philippines organized by the Samahang Basketbol ng Pilipinas. An earlier version of the cup, dubbed the MVP Cup Invitational Championships, was conceived in 2010 to prepare the Philippine national basketball team for FIBA-related competitions by having them compete against other national teams or top-level professional clubs.

History 
In 2010, the Samahang Basketbol ng Pilipinas, under the leadership of Manny V. Pangilinan, organized a four-day pocket tournament to prepare the Smart Gilas Pilipinas for the 2011 FIBA Asia Championship and the 2010 Asian Games. The tournament, called MVP Cup Invitational Championships, was set from June 24 to 27, 2010 at the Ninoy Aquino Stadium. The Jordan national basketball team and the Dongguan New Century of the Chinese Basketball Association were both invited to this cup. Philippine Basketball Association clubs Talk 'N Text Tropang Texters and Barangay Ginebra Kings also participated in the event.

In 2015, the cup was revived as a pocket tournament to prepare the Philippine national basketball team for the 2015 FIBA Asia Championship at Changsha, Hunan. The tournament was held from September 11 to 13, 2015 at the Smart Araneta Coliseum. Initially, the national teams of Lebanon and Chinese Taipei and New Zealand-based Wellington Saints confirmed their participation in the event. Lebanon later withdrew from the tournament before playing a single game. The national teams China, South Korea and Senegal have also been invited to join in the tournament but did not confirmed their participation.

The Samahang Basketbol ng Pilipinas projects the MVP Cup to become an annual tournament similar to the FIBA Stanković Continental Champions' Cup and William Jones Cup.

Results

Medal tally

By country

By club or team

Participation details

References

External links
SBP Official website
Smart Gilas Basketball News and Updates
Team Pilipinas News Update Site

 
Basketball competitions in Asia between national teams
International basketball competitions hosted by the Philippines
Recurring sporting events established in 2010
2010 establishments in the Philippines